The floss is a popular dance move in which a person repeatedly swings their arms, with clenched fists, from the back of their body to the front, on each side.

Etymology 
The name comes from the moves themselves, which involve "a lot of fast arms and hip swings as though using a huge, invisible piece of dental floss".

History 
Exact origins of the dance are unclear; however, there is documentation of students at International School of Beijing performing the dance as early as 2013, the same year that Matthew Bisping did it dancing in the crowd at Austin City Limits.

The earliest instance of the dance being promoted on the internet was in a 2014 clip uploaded by the YouTube channel JStuStudios, run by content creators Justin Stewart and Andrew Scites. Stewart and Scites have performed the dance in televised appearances, such as The Meredith Vieira Show. Videos of the dance on social media achieved viral popularity after 14-year-old Russell Horning, known as "the backpack kid", performed the dance in a August 2016 video. Horning was invited to participate in a live Saturday Night Live performance of Katy Perry's song "Swish Swish" in May 2017. It has since become a trend among children and younger teens, and has been performed by celebrities in videos. The floss has been featured in The Simpsons, and in television shows airing on Universal Kids, Disney XD, and Disney Channel.

Flossing is featured in the 2017 video game Fortnite Battle Royale, developed and published by Epic Games, as a limited-time dance "emote" as a reward from the Battle Pass Season 2 that can be performed by the characters while playing. Flossing has become popular in schools due to the popularity of Fortnite and because of support from parents and administrators, as flossing can be seen as lacking the relative eroticism seen in other dance moves popular with young people. In December 2018, Horning's mother filed a lawsuit against Epic Games for copyright infringement of the dance emote, the third such similar that Epic had seen. Horning's suit against Epic resulted in Playground Games removing the dance emote in their 2018 racing video game Forza Horizon 4 via an update to avoid possible litigation against them.

References 

Street dance
2010s fads and trends
Fortnite
Novelty and fad dances
Shorty Award winners
Internet memes introduced in 2017